Patrik Lörtscher (born 19 March 1960) is a Swiss curler, an Olympic champion and world champion. He received a gold medal at the 1998 Winter Olympics in Nagano. He was the world champion in 1981, and the European champion in 1978 and 1981.

References

External links
 

1960 births
Living people
Swiss male curlers
Olympic curlers of Switzerland
Curlers at the 1998 Winter Olympics
Olympic gold medalists for Switzerland
World curling champions
Olympic medalists in curling
Medalists at the 1998 Winter Olympics
European curling champions
Swiss curling champions
20th-century Swiss people